Joseph Weigl (28 March 1766 – 3 February 1846) was an Austrian composer and conductor, born in Eisenstadt, Hungary, Austrian Empire.

The son of Joseph Franz Weigl (1740–1820), the principal cellist in the orchestra of the Esterházy family, he studied music under Johann Georg Albrechtsberger, Wolfgang Amadeus Mozart and  Antonio Salieri. He became Kapellmeister at the court theatre in Vienna in 1792, and from 1827 to 1838 was vice-Kapellmeister of the court.

Weigl composed a number of operas, both Italian and German and in various genres, although most of his late works are pieces of sacred music. His best known work was the opera Die Schweizerfamilie (1809).  He also set Emanuel Schikaneder's libretto Vestas Feuer (1805), after  his close friend Ludwig van Beethoven had composed a single scene and then abandoned it.

He died in Vienna.

Operas 
(first performed in Vienna, unless otherwise noted)
 Die unnütze Vorsicht oder Die betrogene Arglist, puppet opera in one act, (1783)
 Il pazzo per forza, opera in two acts (1788)
 La caffettiera bizzarra, komische Oper in three acts (1790)
 Der Strazzensammler oder Ein gutes Herz ziert jeden Stand, komische Oper in one act (1792)
 La principessa d’Amalfi, komische Oper in two acts (1794)
 Das Petermännchen, play with songs in eight scenes (1794)
 Giulietta e Pierotto, dramma giocoso in two acts (1794)
 I solitari, opera seria in three acts (1797)
 L’amor marinaro ossia Il corsaro, dramma giocoso in two acts (1797)
 Das Dorf im Gebirge, play with songs in two acts (1798)
 L’accademia del maestro Cisolfaut, opera in two acts (1798)
 L’uniforme, heroisch-komische Oper in three acts (Schönbrunn 1800), also as Die Uniform (1805)
 Vestas Feuer, heroische Oper in two acts (1805)
 Il principe invisibile, opera in five acts (Laxenburg 1806)
 Kaiser Hadrian, grosse Oper in three acts (1807)
 Adrian von Ostade, opera in one act (1807)
 Cleopatra, opera in two acts (Milan 1807)
 Il rivale di se stesso, opera in two acts (Milan 1808)
 Das Waisenhaus, Singspiel in two acts (1808)
 Die Schweizer Familie, lyrische Oper in three acts (1809)
 Der Einsiedler auf den Alpen, opera in one act (1810)
 Die Verwandlungen, operetta in one act (1810)
 Franziska von Foix, heroisch-komische Oper in three acts (1812)
 Der Bergsturz, Singspiel in three acts (1813)
 Die Jugend Peter des Großen, opera in three acts (1814)
 L’imboscata, opera in two acts (Milan 1815)
 Margaritta d’Anjou ossia L’orfana d’Inghilterra, melodramma eroicomico in two acts (1819)
 Die Nachtigall und der Rabe, opera in one act (1818)
 Daniel in der Löwengrube oder Baals Sturz, heroische Oper in three acts (1820)
 König Waldemar oder Die dänischen Fischer, Singspiel in one act (1821)
 Edmund und Caroline, opera in one act (1821)
 Die eiserne Pforte, grosse Oper in two acts (1823)

Further reading 
 Warrack, John and West, Ewan (1992), The Oxford Dictionary of Opera, 782 pages, .

External links 

 "Weigl, Joseph" on Operone.de
 L'amor marinaro
 Der Bergsturz
 

1766 births
1846 deaths
People from Eisenstadt
18th-century classical composers
18th-century Austrian male musicians
19th-century classical composers
Austrian opera composers
Male opera composers
Austrian classical composers
Hungarian composers
Hungarian male composers
18th-century Austrian people
19th-century Austrian people
18th-century Hungarian people
19th-century Hungarian people
Hungarian-German people
Hungarian expatriates in Austria
Pupils of Antonio Salieri
Pupils of Johann Georg Albrechtsberger
Austrian male classical composers
19th-century male musicians